Victorian Railways 'Old' V class were the first government goods steam locomotives on Victorian Railways, built by George England & Co. The four  tender locomotives were built in 1857-8 with builder's numbers 142-145. They arrived in Port Phillip in September 1858 along with  passenger locomotive No. 1.

Victorian Railways initially numbered passenger and goods locomotives separately. The goods engines were numbered 1-4 and the passenger engine No.1. This was soon changed with the goods locos being numbers 2-5. This was later changed to odd numbers for goods locomotives and even numbers for passenger locos. This system remained in use until 1912.

In 1886, the goods locos were allocat6ed to Class V. Eventually number 13 was sold, then bought back and renumbered 497. No 11 was sold in May 1891 to contractor Andrew O'Keefe for $2700. The remaining locomotives were withdrawn in 1904, with the last No 15 being withdrawn on 13 September.

References

Specific

External links
 V Class loco of 0-6-0 type circa 1858

0-6-0 locomotives
V class 1857
Railway locomotives introduced in 1859
Broad gauge locomotives in Australia
Scrapped locomotives
George England and Company locomotives